Shawn Stiffler (born April 2, 1979) is an American baseball coach and former pitcher, now serving as head coach of the Notre Dame Fighting Irish. He played college baseball for the George Mason Patriots from 1998 to 2001 for head coach Bill Brown. Stiffler had been a part of the Rams baseball program since 2007, where he spent the first 5 seasons as an assistant to Paul Keyes.

Playing career 

Stiffler played high school baseball from 1994–1997 at Somerset Area High School, in Somerset, Pennsylvania where he earned All-American honors as a pitcher. He was drafted in the 53rd round by the Minnesota Twins in the 1997 MLB Draft, but elected instead to continue his baseball career at the collegiate level, joining the George Mason Patriots baseball team.

Coaching career 

Immediately following his career with George Mason, Stiffler was picked up as an assistant for the George Mason Patriots baseball program. He worked the first two years as the number two assistant before being promoted to the head assistant for the 2004 season. Stiffler was hired as the Virginia Commonwealth's (VCU) pitching coach and recruiting coordinator. As a recruiter for VCU, Stiffler recruited 15 eventual Major League Baseball draft picks. He would serve the role as a recruiter and pitching coach until 2007, where he was promoted to an assistant. In Stiffler's first season as an assistant, the Rams would boast one of their strongest campaigns in program history, winning 27 games and the 2007 CAA Tournament.

On April 11, 2012, Stiffler was named the head coach on an interim basis when Paul Keyes stepped down to health reasons. Stiffler finished the 2012 season out with a 12–9 record, and in December 2012 was promoted to head coach on a full-time basis.

In 2015, Stiffler led his team to the best season in school history. The Rams finished 40–25 overall with Stiffler leading the team to their first NCAA Division I Super Regional appearance, being recognized by both the NCBWA and Collegiate Baseball Coach of the Year.

On July 12, 2022, it was reported that Shawn Stiffler is being hired to be the next head baseball coach at the University of Notre Dame.

Heading coaching record 
Below is a table of Stiffler's yearly records as an NCAA head baseball coach.

See also 
List of current NCAA Division I baseball coaches

References

External links 

 Shawn Stiffler Profile on VCUAthletics.com

1979 births
Living people
Baseball coaches from Pennsylvania
Baseball players from Pennsylvania
VCU Rams baseball coaches
George Mason Patriots baseball coaches
George Mason Patriots baseball players
Notre Dame Fighting Irish baseball coaches
People from Somerset, Pennsylvania